Daniel Roekito (born May 19, 1952 in Rembang Regency, Central Java, Indonesia) is an Indonesian football manager who has coached several teams, such as lead Barito Putera become semifinalists in 1994/95 Liga Indonesia, with his greatest achievement being to bring the Indonesian championship to Persik Kediri in 2006.

Honours

Manager
Persik Kediri
 Liga Indonesia Premier Division: 2006

References

1952 births
Living people
Persib Bandung managers
Indonesian football managers